Fernando José Riera Bauzá (27 June 1920 – 23 September 2010) was a Chilean professional football player and manager, patriarch of Chilean football.

Career

Riera was born in Santiago, Chile. As a footballer, he played for Chile in the 1942, 1947 and 1949 Copa Américas. He also played at the 1950 FIFA World Cup, and managed them on home soil to a third place in the 1962 World Cup. In 1962–63, Riera led Portuguese side Benfica to the Primeira Liga title. He returned to the club in 1966 and led them to another champions title. In the 1963 England v Rest of the World football match, Riera coached the FIFA World XI team; it was the first FIFA XI team in the history of the game. In Chile, he left a legacy with disciple coaches such as Arturo Salah and Manuel Pellegrini, leaving a tradition and an identity for Chilean football. Riera died in his home city, Santiago of an apparent heart attack.

Honours
Benfica
Primeira Liga: 1962-63, 1966-67
European Cup runner-up: 1963
Intercontinental Cup runner-up: 1962

Chile
FIFA World Cup third place: 1962

References

External links

 Fernando Riera at Partidos de La Roja 
 Game log  at Historia de Boca 

1920 births
2010 deaths
Footballers from Santiago
Chilean people of Spanish descent
Chilean people of Catalan descent
Association football forwards
Association football wingers
Chilean footballers
Chile international footballers
1950 FIFA World Cup players
Unión Española footballers
Club Deportivo Universidad Católica footballers
Stade de Reims players
FC Rouen players
Chilean expatriate footballers
Expatriate footballers in France
Expatriate footballers in Venezuela 
Chilean Primera División players
Ligue 1 players
Venezuelan Primera División players
Chilean football managers
Chile national football team managers
Chile national under-20 football team managers
1962 FIFA World Cup managers
C.F. Os Belenenses managers
S.L. Benfica managers
Club Deportivo Universidad Católica managers
Club Nacional de Football managers
RCD Espanyol managers
Boca Juniors managers
FC Porto managers
Deportivo de La Coruña managers
Olympique de Marseille managers
Sporting CP managers
C.F. Monterrey managers
Club Deportivo Palestino managers
Universidad de Chile managers
Everton de Viña del Mar managers
Primeira Liga managers
Chilean Primera División managers
Uruguayan Primera División managers
Segunda División managers
Argentine Primera División managers
Ligue 1 managers
Liga MX managers
Chilean expatriate football managers
Expatriate football managers in Portugal
Expatriate football managers in Uruguay
Expatriate football managers in Spain
Expatriate football managers in Argentina
Expatriate football managers in France
Expatriate football managers in Mexico
Chilean expatriate sportspeople in France
Chilean expatriate sportspeople in Venezuela
Chilean expatriate sportspeople in Portugal
Chilean expatriate sportspeople in Uruguay
Chilean expatriate sportspeople in Spain
Chilean expatriate sportspeople in Argentina
Chilean expatriate sportspeople in Mexico